The 30th Mixed Brigade was a unit of the Spanish Republican Army created during the Spanish Civil War. Throughout the war he intervened in various battles, such as the Segovia Offensive, Battle of Brunete, Levante Offensive and the Battle of Peñarroya.

History 
The unit was created on December 31, 1936 on the Guadarrama front from the forces of Domingo Moriones, being assigned to the 2nd Division of the I Army Corps. The command of the 30th Mixed Brigade was entrusted to Manuel Tagüeña Lacorte. Among the brigade units was the Alpine battalion, of which part was formed by the Club Peñalara skiers. The 30th Mixed Brigade remained in its positions in the mountains until the spring of 1937.

In May 1937 the brigade was assigned to participate in the Segovia Offensive. On May 30, two of its battalions attacked Cabeza Lijar's position, while another battalion attacked Cabeza Rey, although the assaults were unsuccessful. In July it took part in the Battle of Brunete, successfully defending its positions on July 22.

In August, Tagüeña took command of a division, being relieved by José Suárez Montero. For about a year the brigade remained located at the Madrid front, with its command post at Los Berrocales.

On July 3, 1938, the brigade was assigned to the 61st Division, being sent to the Levante front, under the command of Vicente Pragas, to face the nationalist offensive. On January 13, 1939, it was sent to the Hinojosa del Duque sector, with the 51st Division, to take part in the Battle of Peñarroya.

Command 
 Commanders
 Manuel Tagüeña Lacorte;
 José Suárez Montero;
 Vicente Pragas;

 Commissioners
 Ángel Marcos Salas, of the CNT;
 Diego Pastor, of the JSU;
 Pedro Orgaz Librero, of the PCE;
 Cristóbal Cáliz Almirón, of the PSOE;
 Tomás Catalán;

 Chiefs of Staff
 Alejandro Veramendi Bueno;
 Paradinas;
 Ángel Tresaco Ayerra;

Notes

References

Bibliography 
  
 
 
 
 
 
 

Military units and formations established in 1936
Military units and formations disestablished in 1939
Mixed Brigades (Spain)
Military units and formations of the Spanish Civil War
Military history of Spain
Armed Forces of the Second Spanish Republic